The men's 50 kilometres walk competition of the athletics events at the 2019 Pan American Games took place on 11 August on a temporary circuit around the Parque Kennedy in Lima, Peru. The defending Pan American Games champion was Andrés Chocho of Ecuador.

Records

Schedule

Abbreviations
All times shown are in hours:minutes:seconds

Results
The results were as follows:

References

Athletics at the 2019 Pan American Games